Trixagus chevrolati is a species of small false click beetle in the family Throscidae. It is found in Central America and North America.

References

Further reading

 
 

Elateroidea
Articles created by Qbugbot
Beetles described in 1859